Eric, Erik, or Erick Miller may refer to:

Arts and entertainment
Eric Miller (record producer) (c. 1941–2017), American record producer and Norman Granz's protégé
Eric Miller (photographer) (born 1951), South African photographer during and after apartheid
Eric Miller (musician), American disc jockey
Eric Miller (Shortland Street), fictional soap opera character in Shortland Street

Business and industry
Eric Miller (industrialist) (1882–1958), British industrialist in the rubber industry
Eric Miller (businessman) (1926–1977), English businessman, Chairman of Peachey Properties
Erick Miller, American entrepreneur

Sports
Erik Miller (born 1974), American rower
Eric Miller (rugby union) (born 1975), Irish rugby player
Eric Miller (soccer) (born 1993), American soccer player

Others
Eric J. Miller (born 1951), Canadian professor of civil engineering at the University of Toronto
Eric D. Miller (born 1975), American lawyer and federal judge
Eric Lawrence Miller, American professor of electrical engineering at Tufts University

Other uses